The 2009 Israel Open was a professional tennis tournament played on Hard courts. It was part of the Tretorn SERIE+ of the 2009 ATP Challenger Tour. It took place in Ramat HaSharon, Israel between 4 and 10 May 2009.

Singles entrants

Seeds

 Rankings are as of 20 April 2009.

Other entrants
The following players received wildcards into the singles main draw:
  Grigor Dimitrov
  Amir Hadad
  Almog Mashiach
  Noam Okun

The following players received entry from the qualifying draw:
  Pierre-Ludovic Duclos
  Chris Eaton
  Evgeny Kirillov
  Sebastian Rieschick

Champions

Men's singles

 Lu Yen-hsun def.  Benjamin Becker, 6–3, 3–1, ret.

Men's doubles

 George Bastl /  Chris Guccione def.  Jonathan Erlich /  Andy Ram, 7–5, 7–6(6).

References
Official website
ITF search 
2009 Draws

Israel Open
Tennis tournaments in Israel
2009 in Israeli sport
Israel Open